Trouble No More is an album by the American musician Darden Smith, released in 1990. It was a commercial disappointment.

Smith promoted the album by touring with Marshall Crenshaw.

Production
The album was produced by Pete Anderson, Martin Lascelles, and Smith. The sessions began in Los Angeles, with Anderson; Columbia Records and Smith decided to do more recording in Austin, with Lascelles. Two of the album's songs were cowritten with Boo Hewerdine, with whom Smith had recorded an album that was released one year prior to Trouble No More. "Johnny Was a Lucky One" is about a Vietnam veteran. Preston Hubbard, of the Fabulous Thunderbirds, played bass on "Fall Apart at the Seams" and "Frankie & Sue".

Critical reception

Spin noted that "Smith's melodies ride a fine line between divinely catchy and John Mellencamp rejects." The Chicago Reader called the album "questioning, calm, and likeable," writing that "he has an intimate, cozy way with a melody–the one on the shimmering '2,000 Years', for example, efficiently overwhelms the song's kinda dumb apocalyptic visions." The Vancouver Sun praised the "lush melodies, sweeping acoustic guitar rhythms and richly topical lyrics."

The Windsor Star thought that "this mainly acoustic set features good melodies, Smith's emotional vocals, and some great arrangements." The Edmonton Journal determined that Trouble No More "goes to waste in a flurry of plagiarism ... His 'Ashes to Ashes' sounds so like Mellencamp's 'Jack And Diane' it warrants a court order." The Philadelphia Inquirer deemed "Fall Apart at the Seams" the album's best song, writing that Smith has "from his country roots toward a lean pop sound."

The Encyclopedia of Popular Music stated that Trouble No More was "possibly" Smith's best album.

Track listing

References

1990 albums
albums produced by Pete Anderson
Columbia Records albums